The House of Councillors is the upper house of the National Diet of Japan.

House of Councillors may also refer to:
House of Councillors (Bavaria)
House of Councillors (Morocco)
House of Councillors (South Korea)